Kiriti may refer to:
Kiriti (Arjuna) (one of the names of Arjuna)
Kiriti (settlement)